Phillip Anthony "Tony" Crockett (23 August 1945 – 30 June 2008) was a Welsh Anglican bishop. He was the Bishop of Bangor from 2004 until his death from prostate cancer in 2008.

Early life and education
Crockett was born on 23 August 1945. He was educated at Pontypridd County Grammar School, an all-boys state grammar school in Pontypridd. He studied classics at King's College London, graduating with a Bachelor of Arts (BA) degree in 1967. He remained at King's to study theology in preparation for ordination, completing a Bachelor of Divinity (BD) degree and the Associateship of King's College (AKC) qualification in 1970. He then underwent a year of training at St Michael's College, Llandaff, an Anglican theological college in Wales, leaving in 1971 to be ordained.

Ordained ministry
Crockett was ordained in the Church in Wales as a deacon in 1971 and as a priest in 1972. He was a curate at Aberdare and Whitchurch (Cardiff). From 1978 to 1986 he was Vicar of Llanafan y Trawsgoed then Rector of Dowlai before serving eight years as the Secretary of the Board of Ministry of the Church in Wales. A fluent Welsh speaker, his final post before his ordination to the episcopate was as Archdeacon of Carmarthen (1999-2004).

In 2004, Crockett became the Bishop of Bangor.

Personal life
Crockett was the first divorced person in the United Kingdom to be appointed as a bishop in a mainstream church, amidst some controversy. In 1985 he separated from his first wife, with whom he had three children. He married Caroline Ann Owen (born 1959) in 1999 and also ordained her in 2006.

References

1945 births
Alumni of King's College London
Associates of King's College London
21st-century bishops of the Church in Wales
Archdeacons of Carmarthen
Bishops of Bangor
2008 deaths
People educated at Pontypridd High School
Alumni of St Michael's College, Llandaff